Digital Rock is the third studio album by French-English musician Space Cowboy. It was released digitally on 31 July 2006 in Japan and physically on 29 January 2007 in the United Kingdom by Tiger Trax Records.

Singles
The lead single "My Egyptian Lover", which features female singer-rapper and labelmate Nadia Oh, was playlisted on several radio stations, including BBC Radio 1, Kiss and Galaxy, with the hit video directed by James Sutton on frequent play on TV stations such as MTV. The single was released in the UK on 22 January 2007, reaching number forty-five on the UK Singles Chart.

Track listing

Release history

Personnel
 Nicolas Dresti - Composer, Engineer, Mixing, Multi Instruments, Producer, Programming, Vocals
 Chris Butler - Composer
 Jeff Knowler - Vocal Engineer
 George Miller - Technical Support, Web Design
 James Bryan Sutton - Artwork, Design

References

2006 albums
Space Cowboy (musician) albums